The Cañón de Santa Elena Flora and Fauna Protection Area (Spanish: Área de Protección de Flora y Fauna Cañón de Santa Elena) is a protected area for plants and wildlife in the Mexican municipalities of Manuel Benavides and Ojinaga, in the state of Chihuahua. It was founded on November 7, 1994 and has an area of 277,209 hectares.

The purpose of the reserve is to protect the Chihuahuan Desert, home to many species of plants and wildlife. Among the first scrub stands microphyll desert, the desert scrub rosetophylous, the pasture, the oak forest and riparian vegetation, including various species abound. In the second highlights the birds and mammals that have adapted to aridity, such as wildcat and some deer, as well as birds of prey.

History 
The arrowheads, mortars and paintings found at the site indicate the following human occupation periods: Paleo-Indian (15,000–6,500 BC), Archaic (6500 BC – 900 AD), early Postclassic (900–1500 AD), and late Postclassic (1300–1680). These populations were dispersed with seasonal movements, allowing the use of resources. They engaged in fishing, the collection, hunting, and agriculture. Among the groups transiting this area were the Conchos, the Jumano, the Chisos and Apaches, the Chiricahua, the Mescaleros and Lipanes.

The Spanish and Comanche arrived at the same time, and ended with the Mescalero and Lipan. The colonial government established the Rio Grande as a line of defense, where he built small fortifications, which were guarded by a garrison of soldiers. These were San Carlos, in Chihuahua, and the Board of Rivers, San Vicente, Santa Rosa and San Juan Bautista, in Coahuila. Until 1890 the region remained virtually uninhabited due to attacks by Apaches and Comanche tribes.

From 1784, the fort of San Carlos was abandoned and was only used by travelers, who were protected from attack by Apaches and bandits. The first council of municipality of Ojinaga was built in 1824, and was annexed in 1831, as a section of San Carlos, which bears the name of Manuel Benavides.

Geography 

The protected area is in the Chihuahuan desert ecoregion. It includes a number of mountain ranges separated by valleys and undulating plains.

Location 
The Santa Elena Canyon is the state of Chihuahua, bounded on the north by the Rio Grande and on the east by Coahuila. 80% of the reserve is located in the municipalities of Manuel Benavides and Ojinaga. It adjoins Ocampo Flora and Fauna Protection Area on the east.

Geology 
The area has a base of Cretaceous limestone on which developed volcanic in mid-Tertiary. Volcanism caused folds between the plates, because the fragment into blocks of lifts formed and depressions. In areas are metamorphic rocks Palaeozoic granitic and igneous intrusions.

The area of Santa Elena Canyon includes the mountain ranges of El Ranchito, Sierra Rica and El Mulatto, among which are the valleys of Alamo, Chapó, El Mulato, and Rancho Blanco. Also they highlight the low hills of Manuel Benavides, Paso Lajitas and San Antonio. Much of the area is flat, with slopes less than 8% and bigoted hills and formations.

Climate 

The area has an extremely dry and hot climate. In addition, there is a contrast between the desert and cold temperate ecosystems. The climate is arid, with little rain in summer.

Demographics 
The main villages of the area are Manuel Benavides, which is the county seat, Loma de Juárez, El Mulato, Area Montoya, Paso Lajitas, New Lajitas, Santa Elena, Altares, Paso de San Antonio, San Antonio Alamos, Providence, Jars of Wizards and Alamos Marquez. In addition, the towns of Ojinaga, La Mula, Mahijoma and Morita are located in the area of influence. It is estimated that 2,578 inhabitants live in the protected area.

Within the protected area there are 125 properties, which occupy 34.8% of the area, 13 ejidos, which occupy 59.4%, and foundations and centers of population and public lands occupy the remaining 5.8%. The soils of the area and the area of influence are used for agriculture, livestock, and mining.

Flora and fauna 

In the area, there are several species, of which 79 are protected. Thirteen of these are species of plants, mostly cacti, while the rest are 66 species of wildlife, among which include the black bear, the golden eagle, the peregrine falcon and beaver.

The area has a great diversity of vegetation, highlighting the scrub desert microphyll, scrub desert rosetophylous, the pasture, the oak forest and vegetation riparian, and also scrub Guamis, mariola, cenixo and guayacán in addition to mesquite, catnip and huizaches. In the region with resetófila vegetation, lechuguilla, sotol and various species of cactus develop. Moreover, there is riparian vegetation consisting of poplars and willows.

In the desert scrub microphyll, various species such as Guamis (Larrea tridentata), hojasén (Flourensia cernua), mariola (Parthenium incanum), mesquite (Prosopis glandulosa), ocotillo (Founquieria splendens) and reed (Koeberlinia spinosa), among others may be found. In the desert scrub rosetophylous, there are species such as palm (Yucca rostrata), lechuguilla (Agave lechugilla), maguey (Agave spp), among others. In the grasslands, there are species such as penknives (Bouteloua gracilis) or the curly mesquite (Hilaria belangeri), among others. This table groups vegetation protection area are based on its altitude and its botanical composition.

The fauna of the region is composed by birds and mammals that have adapted to aridity. Among the species that inhabit the area are the black-tailed jackrabbit, the bobcat (Lynx rufus), the whitetail deer (Odocoileus virginianus), the mule deer (Odocoileus hemionus), the collared peccary (Tayassu tajacu), mourning doves, some ducks and coyotes. There are also birds of prey like peregrine falcon (Falcao peregrinus), the kestrel (Falco sparverius) and the golden eagle (Aquila chrysaetos). In addition, the presence of songbirds and ornamental birds stands out, and several species of fish.

Creating the protected area 

In 1990, at the request of the Government of the State of Chihuahua, the process for creating a Biosphere Reserve in Northwest state of Chihuahua was initiated, bordering with the Big Bend National Park in United States. After some meetings with villagers and local authorities, the region was declared a Protected Area of Flora and Fauna in 1994. This protected area was included within the area of the Forest Protected Area, and declared in 1934, with the aim of conserving irrigation watersheds, protecting the flow of the Amistad Reservoir in Coahuila.

The Federal government of the United States had pushed, since 1934, for the creation of a protected area in Mexico to be the counterpart of Big Bend National Park. These initiatives were not considered for various reasons until 1994, except for the creation of the Department of Forest Protection enacted in 1934.

Threats to the reserve 
The protected area is affected by various threats, all being caused by humans. These may be environmental, due to the excesses committed by the settlers on the resources of pasture, with an overload of ranching and cattle. Also, some people are clearing land for new crops, thus losing native plant species. Another threat is the mining exploitation, using materials extracted for works and services. There is also the plant smuggling, especially cactus, fossils and other archaeological artifacts used by the ancient inhabitants of the area. A looming threat is unchecked tourism, which can inadvertently damage parts of the reserve.

Goals 
This reserve was created with the aim of having a protected area that represented the ecological area known as Chihuahuan desert, where counterpart of protected areas border of Texas, being able to extend the protection of ecosystems and conducting joint actions in ecological matters. A study of Autonomous University of Chihuahua conducted in 1994 also argues that the region should be protected because it has a considerable amount of endangered species (13 species of flora and 66 of fauna) and a large geological, hydrological and historical heritage, and a striking contrast between the ecosystems of desert and forest.

See also 
 Mexico–United States international park

Notes

References

Bibliography

External links 
 Map  -Protection Area of Flora and Fauna Santa Elena Canyon, Chihuahua

Protected areas of the Chihuahuan Desert
Protected areas of Chihuahua (state)
Flora and fauna protection areas of Mexico